Lazarus may refer to:

People
Lazarus (name), a surname and a given name

 Lazarus of Bethany, a Biblical figure described as being raised from the dead by Jesus
 Lazarus, a Biblical figure from the parable of the Rich man and Lazarus
 Lazarus of Persia (died 326), martyr
 Lazarus of Aix (died 441), bishop of Aix-en-Provence
 Lazarus (bishop of Milan), from 438 to 449
 Lazarus (rapper), an American rapper and physician
 Lazarus Chigwandali, Malawian musician commonly known as just 'Lazarus'

Honorific orders 
 Order of Saint Lazarus, a medieval Catholic military order
 Order of Saint Lazarus (statuted 1910), a Christian honorific order in Paris, France

Arts, entertainment, and media

Fictional entities
 Lazarus Missions, in the film Interstellar (2014)
 For characters, see Lazarus (name)#Fictional characters

Films 
 Lazarus (1902 film), an Australian religious film
 Lazarus, a 2015 film also known as The Lazarus Effect

Gaming
 Project Lazarus, a plot element in the game Mass Effect 2
 Ultima V: Lazarus, a 2005 fan remake of the RPG Ultima V using the Dungeon Siege engine

Music 
Lazarus (band)

Albums, EPs, and compositions
 Lazarus (Lazarus album) (1971)
 Lazarus, a 2009 album by Hacride, and its title song
 Lazarus (Schubert), D 689 (1820), an unfinished Easter cantata by Franz Schubert
 Lazarus (Travie McCoy album) (2010)

Songs
 "Dives and Lazarus" (ballad), 1893
 "Lazarus" (David Bowie song), 2015
 "Lazarus" (Porcupine Tree song), 2005
 "Lazarus", by the Boo Radleys
 "Lazarus", by David Byrne & St. Vincent from Love This Giant
 "Lazarus", by Chimaira from Chimaira
 "Lazarus", by Circa Survive from Appendage
 "Lazarus", by Corrinne May from Crooked Lines
 "Lazarus", by Fozzy from All That Remains
 "Lazarus", by moe. from Dr. Stan's Prescription, Volume 2
 "Lazarus", by Placebo from the "Meds" single
 "Lazarus", by Trip Lee from Rise, 2014
"Lazarus", by V V Brown from Glitch, 2015
 "Lazarus", by Buffy Sainte-Marie from Many a Mile, 1965
”Lazarus”, by Dave & Boj from We're All Alone in This Together, 2011

Television 

 "Lazarus" (Smallville), a television episode
 "Lazarus" (The X-Files), a 1994 television episode
 "Lazarus", episode 18 of Designated Survivor
 "Lazarus", an episode of season 4 of Shameless

Other uses in arts, entertainment, and media
 Lazarus (comics), a comic book series
 Lazarus (musical), 2015
 Lazarus (soundtrack), a 2016 soundtrack album by the New York cast

Other uses
 Lazarus (department store), a defunct department store chain now branded as Macy's
 Lazarus (software), an integrated software development environment (IDE)
 Lazarus effect, in semiconductor physics
 Lazarus Group, a cybercrime group
 Lazarus Island, Singapore
 Lazarus sign, a reflex movement in brain-dead or brainstem failure patients
 Lazarus taxon, a taxon that disappears for one or more periods from the fossil record, only to appear again later
 Team Lazarus, an Italian motor racing team currently competing in the Auto GP series

See also
 
 
 Lazaretto, a quarantine station for maritime travelers